The 2000–01 season was the 32nd campaign of the Scottish Men's National League, the national basketball league of Scotland. The season featured 10 teams; there were no changes from the previous season. Clark Erikkson Fury won their first league title with a 100% record.

Teams

The line-up for the 2000–01 season featured the following teams:

Aberdeen Buccaneers
Boroughmuir
City of Edinburgh Kings
Clark Erikkson Fury
Dunfermline Reign
Glasgow d2
Midlothian Bulls
Paisley
St Mirren McDonalds
Troon Tornadoes

League table

 Source: Scottish National League 2000-01 - Britball

References

Scottish Basketball Championship Men seasons
basketball
basketball